Donnacona is an industrial town located about  west of Quebec City in Portneuf County, Quebec, Canada.

History
Some people believe the city was named after Donnacona, a 16th-century St. Lawrence Iroquois chief who was taken to France. The chieftain lived further down-river in Stadacona.

It was actually named after the first paper mill erected at the mouth of the Jacques-Cartier River, The Donnacona Paper Ltd. It was located where the Jacques-Cartier River meets the St. Lawrence River. The local paper mill played a key role in creating and quickly developing the local settlement to the point of making Donnacona the most populous urban town in Portneuf County. Economic difficulties affected the lumber and pulp and paper industry and the local factory was sold a number of times. In 2007, Bowater had a debt of $7 billion and merged with Abitibi-Consolidated. The merger was to sell off Abitibi's assets and close its mills for liquidity to settle Bowater's debt. It closed in January 2008. It had employed 240 people manufacturing of 230,000 tonnes per annum of commercial grade paper. The demolition was scheduled to take 12 to 14 months. For three years, the town unsuccessfully tried to find an entrepreneur to restart the industry. Demolition began in March 2011.

Prior to the chartering of Donnacona as a town in 1915, the area was named Pointe-aux-Écureuils. A New France Seigneurie existed under the name of Les Écureuils as a surrounding rural parish municipality prior to its final merge with Donnacona in 1967.

Demographics 

Population trend:
 Population in 2021: 7436
 Population in 2014: 6960
 Population in 2011: 6283 (2006 to 2011 population change: 12.9%)
 Population in 2006: 5564
 Population in 2001: 5479
 Population in 1996: 5739
 Population in 1991: 5659

Mother tongue:
 English as first language: 1.1%
 French as first language: 97.4%
 English and French as first language: 0.4%
 Other as first language: 0.9%

Economy
A Canadian National rail line through Donnacona borders the St. Lawrence. There is no rail station.

The Federal Correctional Service Canada maximum security Donnacona Institution is located along Route 138.

Transportation
Autoroute 40 passes through the town.

Sister city
Its sister city is Jarnac, France.

Notable residents
Gérald Gallant, (May 5, 1950), a contract killer who admitted to committing 28 murders and 12 attempted murders between 1978 and 2003.

References

External links

 City Of Donnacona

Cities and towns in Quebec
Incorporated places in Capitale-Nationale